Stanovaya is a rural locality (a village) in Andreyevskoye Rural Settlement, Vashkinsky District, Vologda Oblast, Russia. The population was 12 as of 2002.

Geography 
Stanovaya is located 28 km north of Lipin Bor (the district's administrative centre) by road. Andreyevskaya is the nearest rural locality.

References 

Rural localities in Vashkinsky District